Odhavram (4 October 1889 – 13 January 1957) was an Indian religious teacher and a follower of Mohandas Gandhi.  He campaigned for education, the poor, and the rights of Dalits.

Early years
Odhavram was born in Jakhau, a small village located on the west coast of Gujarat, India, in the district of Kutchh. He was born in a Bhanushali family on the auspicious day of the Hindu festival of  "Ram Navami" in 1889, he was named Udhav. His parents were Chaagbai, the mother, and Hemraj, the father. Udhav had one elder brother and two sisters.

As a kid, Udhav behaved as a child but was more inclined towards spirituality. He loved music and Bhajans from the age of 5, and when he was 9, he always carried the Bhagwad Geta to school and at play too. He used to narrate single lines from the sacred Geeta to his friends and, at times, discuss the same with Pandits too.

Udhav got his first Guru at the age of 9, Shanakaranand from Mandvi Takula in Kutch. Udhav learned Sanskrit and the Vedas from Shankaranand for six months, and following a life-threatening accident in the ashram, he was returned to Jakhau. Later, Udhav came to Bombay and worked as a gunny-bag laborer for 8 years before finally leaving Bombay, dedicating his life to mankind and the upliftment of Kutch and Gujarat.

Ishwar Ashram
Odhavram came to Vandhay in Kutchh. Lalram was the Mahant at Vandhai's Ishwar Ashram. The Vandhai Ashram follows the Harihar parampara. The Harihar Parampara was started by Deva Saheb in Hamla, Kutch, and a few decades later, his disciple Ishwarram settled in Vandhai. After Ishwarrm, Lalram took care of the Ashram and after Lalram,  Odhavram was declared the Mahant of the Ishwar Ashram.

Kutch gurukul
Odhavram has always believed that society cannot progress without education. Odhavram went door to door and person to person in Mumbai, Calcutta, and Madhya Pradesh, asking people to contribute funds to start the first gurukul in Kutch. As the construction of the gurukul began, Odhavram walked from house to house and village to village preaching the need for education. At times, Odhavram used to work as a laborer, carrying bricks overhead, making the cement mix, and feeding workers with food and water. Odhavram welcomed his first batch of 330 students at the Ishwarram Gurukul, which was inaugurated on Vasant Panchami in the year 1937 A.D.
  
Odhavram was firm and dedicated in his decisions, and this dedication made his gurukul dream come true. Now he wanted to push the gurukul barriers further by wanting to teach and educate the blind. He believed and preached that we are all children of God and that we all deserve love and respect in society. A blind person has no option but to beg or rely on family. He wanted to teach the blind self-reliance and respect in society. The school for the blind began in 1938. He called for the brail script from Bombay, and his first batch had 7 or 8 students. Apart from book knowledge, he used to teach them the intelligence of the senses. He revealed to them the power of their ears, nose, and fingers. Sadhu Sevadas, who studied in the blind school, still resides at the Ishawar Ashram in Vandhai, Kutchh.

The 19th and 20th centuries were periods of illiteracy and poverty. People inclined towards spirituality could be easily cheated in the name of God. In the same era, the Kadwa Patidar Samaj fell into the hands of some greedy spiritual Gurus and got converted to a religion that has had no existence in history called the Peerani Panth.

Odhavram struggled for 16 years to bring the entire Patidaar Samaj back to Sanatan Dharma. In this struggle, Odhavram faced three to four life-threatening attacks but escaped without a scratch. Once, a man entered his Sadhana Kutir (meditation place) and attempted, but failed, to shoot at him from point blank range. Once he was attacked by a mob of 8--10 people with swords, but they failed. Odhavram was a believer in "Ahimsa Paramo Dharma" (nonviolence, the highest religion). In his entire life span, he never touched a weapon and still succeeded in his mission on faith and dedication.

Follower of Gandhi
In 1943, Odhavram supported Gandhi’s movement to accept the untouchables  as part of society. This was the only decision in Odhavram's life that turned society against him. Villagers throughout Kutch revolted, but Odhavram stood firm on his decision. Some unsocial elements started provoking the villagers, and people started leaving him. But as every night has a day, the Harijans got their rightful place in society, and Odhavram won his battle for humanism with pride and dignity.

Odhavram was a firm believer of Mahatma Gandhi and a follower of his deeds. Odhavram accepted Gandhi's Swadeshi Apnao slogan and put it into practice the same day. He started weaving his own clothes on the charkha and made it compulsory for every student of the Gurukul to learn and weave. Odhavram used to say one should first practice what he preaches.

In 1945, a convention was called under the leadership of Meher Ali in Mundra. Odhavram was also invited to this convention as his speeches had a very strong impact on people. When Odhavram was invited to give some spiritual discourses, a strange incident happened. Odhavram said, "I cannot die in peace till my motherland is freed from these invaders. In this freedom fight write my name first followed by my 330 students of the Gurukul. I would be honored to sacrifice my life for my motherland". In 1947, India was declared independent, and Odhavram continued to serve mankind.

1940 drought
The year 1940 saw the worst drought in Kutch. Cattle were dying in the thousands. In this period, Odhavram sidelined all his other activities and dedicated his life to the suffering cattle and villagers. Odhavram said, "Saving these speechless cattle is the first and foremost responsibility of a true Hindu. If one has to give away everything he has and even his life for this noble cause, it is worth it". In thousands, cattle started flowing into Vandhai, and Odhavram offered sufficient food, water, and shelter for all. At times he, his students, and the ashram had to starve, but thousands of cows and other cattle were saved.

Bhanushali movement
In 1942, Odhavram started a movement for the Bhanushali community. Bhanushalis are Surya Vanshi, but due to illiteracy and poverty, they were being harassed by society. Odhavram decided to draw a path for his own community and give them their real place in society. He traveled through villages and cities, preaching the value of education, and eventually succeeded in establishing Mandvi's first boarding school. Bhansuhali Haridas Pradhan Joisar sold off almost all his properties and life savings to manage the required funds for this cause. A few years later, Odhavram also struggled to build home shelter for the Bhanushalis who had migrated from Kutch to Bombay for work, and with funds provided by Bhanushali Haridas Velji Joisar of Bombay. The Bhanushali wadi in Bombay came into existence in 1952.

During this era, there was a 9-year-old girl who came very close to Odhavram. Odhavram blessed her with his knowledge, and today she is serving mankind and showing everyone the divine path to happiness. She is Param Pujya Sant Mataji Rama Devi of Haridwar.

Later years
In 1954, Odhavram handed over the Vandhai Ashram to "Dayaddasji" and reached Haridwar to spend the rest of his life at the Ganges. However, upon seeing a few Kutchi’s roaming on the streets of Haridwar without any place to stay, he felt the need for a Dharmashala for people to stay and spend their last days peacefully. He wrote several letters asking for funds and help. Among his very close follower and associate, was Manji Jeram Rathod of Madhapar, who belonged to the Kutch Gurjar Kshatriya Samaj. Manji Jeram took the leadership to build Kutchi Ashram in Haridwar and started with a large personal donation and roamed whole India to collect monies from rich families of his community as well Patidar, Bhanushali, Mistri and other communities of Kutch. Finally, the Kutchhi Lalrameshwar Ashram at Haridwar was established in 1956. Pujya Jashoda Maa gave a helping hand and worked day and night to set up the ashram.

In Haridwar, Odhavram found a holy soul who would follow his path of serving mankind after he was gone. His name was “Valji”. Valji took Diksha from him and became Valdas. Valdas started serving mankind and followed the path laid by Odhavram. Odhavram returned to Vandhai and died on January 13, 1957.

References

Gujarati people
Hindu reformers
People from Kutch district
Indian Hindus
1889 births
1957 deaths
Founders of Indian schools and colleges